Carlos Alberto do Vale Gomes Carvalhas, GCC (born in São Pedro do Sul, 9 November 1941) is a Portuguese economist and politician and former Secretary-General of the Portuguese Communist Party (1993–2004), succeeding the historical leader Álvaro Cunhal.

He was born to António José Bandeira Carvalhas (Baiões, São Pedro do Sul, 22 April 1915 – 4 February 1999) and Esmeraldina do Céu Gomes Quaresma (b. Moldes, Arouca, 9 July 1917). His father was a businessman and owner of the warehouse Discomer that served as a food retailer for the local shops.

He was a deputy of the Assembly of the Republic for two time periods and was a candidate for the Portuguese presidency in 1991, where he received 635,373 votes (12.92%).

On 5 October 2004, he announced his intention to resign. He was replaced by Jerónimo de Sousa on 27 November 2004, at the 17th Congress of the PCP.

His late second cousin was married to the 3rd Viscount of São Pedro do Sul.

Electoral results

|-
!style="background-color:#E9E9E9" align=left colspan="2" rowspan="2"|Candidates 
!style="background-color:#E9E9E9" align=left rowspan="2"|Supporting parties 	
!style="background-color:#E9E9E9" align=right colspan="2"|First round
|-
!style="background-color:#E9E9E9" align=right|Votes
!style="background-color:#E9E9E9" align=right|%
|-
|style="width: 10px" bgcolor=#FF66FF align="center" |
|align=left|Mário Soares
|align=left|Socialist Party, Social Democratic Party
|align="right" |3,459,521
|align="right" |70.35
|-
|style="width: 5px" bgcolor=#0093DD align="center" | 
|align=left|Basílio Horta 
|align=left|Democratic and Social Centre
|align="right" |696,379
|align="right" |14.16
|-
|style="width: 5px" bgcolor=red align="center" | 
|align=left|Carlos Carvalhas
|align=left|Portuguese Communist Party, Ecologist Party "The Greens"
|align="right" |635,373
|align="right" |12.92
|-
|style="width: 5px" bgcolor=#E2062C align="center" |
|align=left|Carlos Marques
|align=left|People's Democratic Union
|align="right" |126,581
|align="right" |2.57
|-
|colspan="3" align=left style="background-color:#E9E9E9"|Total valid
|width="65" align="right" style="background-color:#E9E9E9"|4,917,854
|width="40" align="right" style="background-color:#E9E9E9"|100.00
|-
|align=right colspan="3"|Blank ballots
|width="65" align="right" |112,877
|width="40" align="right" |2.21
|-
|align=right colspan="3" |Invalid ballots
|width="65" align="right"|68,037
|width="40" align="right"|1.33
|-
|colspan="3" align=left style="background-color:#E9E9E9"|Total (turnout 62.16%)
|width="65" align="right" style="background-color:#E9E9E9"|5,098,768  
|width="40" align="right" style="background-color:#E9E9E9"|
|-
|colspan=5 align=left|Source: Comissão Nacional de Eleições
|}

References

1941 births
Living people
People from São Pedro do Sul, Portugal
Portuguese Communist Party politicians
Portuguese anti-fascists
Candidates for President of Portugal
Technical University of Lisbon alumni